Rare metal or Rare Metals may refer to:

 Avalon Rare Metals, a Canadian mineral extraction company
 GPS, V1: Rare Metals, an album by trumpeter Dave Douglas
 Precious metal, any metal of very high value
 Rare-earth element, any naturally occurring metallic element
 Rare Metals, Arizona, an unincorporated community in the United States

See also
 Precious metal (disambiguation)